The Alliance for Heart Failure is a coalition of charities, patient groups, professional bodies, public sector organisations and corporate members working together to raise the profile of heart failure within the UK Government, the National Health Service, and media.  It was formed in October 2015.

The Alliance for Heart Failure's mission is to achieve better outcomes for people with heart failure by ensuring timely diagnosis and access to the right care and support.

Membership 

Current members of the Alliance for Heart Failure are:
 AstraZeneca UK
 Boehringer Ingelheim Limited
 British Association for Cardiovascular Prevention and Rehabilitation
 British Association for Nursing in Cardiovascular Care
 British Society for Echocardiography
 Cardiomyopathy UK
 Cardiovascular Care Partnership UK
 Education for Health
 Medtronic UK
 National Heart & Lung Institute
 Novartis Pharmaceuticals UK Ltd
 The Primary Care Pharmacy Association
 Pumping Marvellous Foundation
 Roche Diagnostics Ltd
 South East Clinical Networks
 UK Clinical Pharmacy Association

Organisation 

The co-chairs are Louise Clayton (British Heart Failure Nurses Forum and British Society for Heart Failure) and Joel Rose from Cardiomyopathy UK. They have a 12-month tenure. Day-to-day decisions are made by a steering committee.

The Alliance for Heart Failure is supported and funded by AstraZeneca UK, Abbott Laboratories, Boehringer Ingelheim Limited, Medtronic Limited, Novartis Pharmaceuticals UK Ltd, and Roche Diagnostics Ltd. Funders are not responsible for any of the materials produced by the Alliance for Heart Failure, which are created independently by the Alliance's Secretariat.

Heart Failure: A call to action 

Heart Failure: A call to action was published on 22 February 2021. The report evaluates the progress made since the 2016 All Party Parliamentary Group ‘Focus on Heart Failure’ report and makes ten new recommendations to improve heart failure care and patient outcomes.

The report also calls for urgent action to meet the growing demand from a rising number of heart failure cases following the impact of the Covid-19 pandemic  .

Heart Failure: A call to action was developed with input from heart failure specialists, patient groups, and professional organisations.

All Party Parliamentary Group on Heart Disease Inquiry into heart failure 

In 2016, the All Party Parliamentary Group on Heart Disease, chaired by Stuart Andrew MP, held an inquiry into living with heart failure.  Written and oral evidence was provided by patients, healthcare professionals, and commissioners. The Inquiry's report, Focus on Heart Failure, was published in September 2016 and made ten recommendations for improving heart failure services.

Nine members of the Alliance for Heart Failure were co-opted onto an advisory panel for the inquiry.  The panel had ten members in total.

National Heart Failure Audit

2020-21 Audit

The National Heart Failure Audit which analysed data from 2020-21, highlighted a serious issue with access to echocardiography services, a vital diagnostic tool for heart failure, as well as a problem with follow up specialist care and cardiac rehabilitation for those living long-term with the illness. It also highlighted the chronic challenge of training and developing echocardiographers to ensure sufficient resources to meet demand in the future.

The Alliance for Heart Failure responded to the report stating that longstanding issues have been exacerbated, rather than caused, by the Covid-19 pandemic.

2017-18 Audit

The National Heart Failure Audit (2017–18), published on 12 September 2019, reported that mortality among patients admitted to hospital remained high overall at 10.1% compared to 9.4% in the previous audit. However, the number of patients seen by heart failure specialists increased to over 82% (from 80% in the last audit), while more than 88% of patients get an echocardiogram. Rates still remain higher for those admitted to Cardiology (92%), however this has decreased since the last report (96%). The rate on General Medical wards remained the same at 84%. The report also recorded an increase in the prescription of key disease-modifying medicines for patients since last year.

The Alliance for Heart Failure responded positively to the report but called for the regional variation in patient service to be urgently addressed.

2016-17 Audit

The National Heart Failure Audit (2016-2017), published on 27 November 2018, reported that mortality among patients admitted to hospital remained at 8.9%, despite more patient episodes being recorded and a trend towards increasing age. The number of patients seen by heart failure specialists increased to over 80%, while 89% of patients get an echocardiogram. However, rates were higher for those admitted to Cardiology (96%) rather than General Medical (84%) wards. Prescriptions for disease modifying medications remained high.

The Alliance for Heart Failure welcomed the improvements but expressed concern at the 'unacceptable' regional variation.

2015-16 Audit

The National Heart Failure Audit (April 2015-March 2016), published on 10 August 2017, reported that mortality among patients admitted to hospital had fallen to 8.9% compared to 9.6% reported in the previous audit. It also reported that the number of patients seen by specialist heart failure nurses remained high at 80%, and that 90% of patients were recorded as having an up to date echocardiogram. The report also recorded an increase in prescriptions for disease modifying medications.

The Alliance for Heart Failure welcomed the findings but called for more to be done to address the vast regional variation in patient outcomes.

National Confidential Enquiry into Patient Outcome and Death (NCEPOD) 

The National Confidential Enquiry into Patient Outcome and Death (NCEPOD), published on 22 November 2018, recommended improvements in the process of care for patients with acute heart failure who died while admitted to hospital as an emergency. Responding to the report, the Alliance for Heart Failure said that it reinforces the need for urgent action to improve heart failure services, and the important role of heart failure specialist nurses, as part of a full multi-disciplinary heart failure team, in maximising outcomes for patients.

References 

 
 
 
 

2000 establishments in the United Kingdom
Medical and health organisations based in the United Kingdom
Heart disease organizations